Fern Acres is a census-designated place (CDP) in Hawaii County, Hawaii, United States, located in the District of Puna. The population was 1,504 at the 2010 census, up from 756 at the 2000 census.

Geography
Fern Acres is located on the eastern side of the island of Hawaii at  (19.511846, -155.089878). It is bordered to the east by Hawaiian Acres, to the north by Mountain View, and to the west by Eden Roc. To the south is the Puna Forest Reserve.

Demographics

As of the census of 2010, there were 1,504 people in 594 households residing in the CDP. The racial makeup of the CDP was 39.30% White, 0.60% African American, 0.40% American Indian & Alaska Native, 6.58% Asian, 11.70% Native Hawaiian & Pacific Islander, 0.73% from other races, and 40.69% from two or more races. Hispanic or Latino of any race were 15.76% of the population.

There were 594 households, out of which 24.4% had children under the age of 18 living with them. The average household size was 2.53.

In the CDP the population was spread out, with 24.1% under the age of 18, 7.5% from 18 to 24, 12.0% from 25 to 34, 21.5% from 35 to 49, 25.3% from 50 to 64, and 9.5% who were 65 years of age or older.  For every 100 females, there were 105.7 males.  For every 100 males there were 94.6 females.

The median income for a household in the CDP at the 2000 census was $31,250, and the median income for a family was $32,981. Males had a median income at the 2000 census of $20,417 versus $23,250 for females. The per capita income for the CDP at the 2000 census was $11,876.  About 10.9% of families and 16.4% of the population were below the poverty line at the 2000 census, including 12.4% of those under age 18 and none of those age 65 or over.

References

External links
Fern Acres Community Association

Census-designated places in Hawaii County, Hawaii
Populated places on Hawaii (island)